Kimmari Roach (born 21 September 1990) is a Jamaican track and field sprinter who specialises in the 100 metres. He has a personal best of 10.12 seconds and was a 60 metres finalist at the 2014 IAAF World Indoor Championships. Roach is a member of Racers Track Club and is coached by Glen Mills.

Born in Saint Andrew Parish, Jamaica, Roach competed at the Jamaican High School Champs as a teenager but did not reach the podium. He made his impact at national level in 2009, winning the Jamaican universities 100 m title and setting a personal best of 10.38 seconds for third at the Kingston Classic meet. He improved to 10.34 to win at the 2010 Penn Relays. At the Jamaican Athletics Championships he ran a new best of 10.13 seconds in the semi-final, then placed third in the 100 m final. He competed in Europe for the first time that year with a win at the Weltklasse in Biberach being his highlight. He was twice runner-up on the 2011 Brazilian Athletics Grand Prix circuit. Roach failed to improve upon his best or make the Jamaican 100 m final that year and the two years after.

A performance of 6.59 seconds in the 60 metres to take third at the 2014 Millrose Games gained him selection for the 2014 IAAF World Indoor Championships. In the semi-final he had a personal best run of 6.55 seconds, but was a little slower in the final, placing eighth in a close race.

Personal bests
50 metres – 5.74 sec (2012)
60 metres – 6.55 sec (2014)
100 metres – 10.12 sec (2014)

References

External links

Living people
1990 births
Jamaican male sprinters
People from Saint Andrew Parish, Jamaica
Commonwealth Games gold medallists for Jamaica
Athletes (track and field) at the 2014 Commonwealth Games
Commonwealth Games medallists in athletics
Medallists at the 2014 Commonwealth Games